Gulf is a 2017 Indian Telugu-language film directed by P. Sunil Kumar Reddy and starring Chetan Maddineni and newcomer Dimple Hayathi. The film is about Indians who move to the Gulf in search of jobs. The film depicts several real incidents.

Cast 
 Chetan Maddineni as Shiva
 Dimple Hayathi as Lakshmi
 Bhadram as Bangarraju
 Mippu as Naveen
 Subramani as Subramani
 Nalla Venu as Somulu
 Nagineedu as Rajaiah
 Jeeva as Balaraju
 Posani Krishna Murali as Manga Reddy
 Tanikella Bharani as Sufi Song Singer
 Sana as Karunakka
 Prabhas Sreenu as Chandram
 తోటపల్లి మధు
 Bithiri Sathi

Production
The director collected experiences of Indian working in the Gulf through email. The film (which was initially planned as a multilingual) is based on the struggles of Indians in the Gulf and stars Chetan (as a weaver's son). The film was mostly shot in Dubai and Ras-Al-Khaima.

Release 
Neeshita Nyayapati of The Times of India gave the film a rating of 2.2 out of 5 stars and wrote that "He [The director] manages to touch upon sensitive topics like physical and sexual abuse of the Indian workers in the Gulf, and does an effective job of it". A critic from 123Telugu gave the film a rating of 2.5 out of 5 and said that "On the whole, Gulf is a very realistic film about the problems that Indians face in the Gulf countries".

References

External links

2017 films
2010s Telugu-language films